American Cigar Company are two historic cigar factory buildings located at Norfolk, Virginia. The buildings were built about 1903 and consist of a stemmery and the boiler room.  Albert F. Huntt is credited as the architect. The American Cigar Co. was created in 1901 as a subsidiary of the American Tobacco Company. It was listed on the National Register of Historic Places in 2009.

The stemmery is a four-story, rectangular brick building on a concrete foundation.  It has a flat roof and corbelled cornice.  The boiler room building is a two-story, three-bay, brick building on a brick foundation.

References

Historic cigar factories
Industrial buildings and structures on the National Register of Historic Places in Virginia
Industrial buildings completed in 1903
Buildings and structures in Norfolk, Virginia
National Register of Historic Places in Norfolk, Virginia
Tobacco buildings in the United States